Losing chess (also known as antichess, the losing game, giveaway chess, suicide chess, killer chess, must-kill, take-all chess, take-me chess, capture chess or losums) is one of the most popular chess variants. The objective of each player is to lose all of their pieces or be stalemated, that is, a misère version. In some variations, a player may also win by checkmating or by being checkmated.

Losing chess was weakly solved in 2016 as a win for White, beginning with 1.e3.

Rules (main variant)
The rules are the same as those for standard chess, except for the following special rules:
 Capturing is compulsory.
 When more than one capture is available, the capturing player may choose.
 The king has no  and accordingly:
 it may be captured like any other piece; 
 there is no check or checkmate;
 therefore the king may expose itself to capture;
 there is no castling;
 a pawn may also be promoted to a king.
 Stalemate is a win for the stalemated player (the player with no legal moves). This includes having no remaining pieces on the board.

Draws by repetition, agreement, or the fifty-move rule work as in standard chess. (This is similar to the dead position rule in standard chess.)

History 
The origin of the game is unknown, but believed to significantly predate an early version, named take me, played in the 1870s. Because of the popularity of losing chess, several variations have spawned. The most widely played (main variant) is described in Popular Chess Variants by D. B. Pritchard. Losing chess began to gain popularity in the 20th century, which was facilitated by some publications about this variant in the UK, Germany, and Italy.

Losing chess gained a new surge in popularity at the turn of the 20th and 21st centuries as an online game, thanks to the implementation of this variant on FICS in 1996, which greatly contributed to the popularization of losing chess. At that time, numerous engines were being developed, endgame tablebases were being created, materials on strategy were being published, and the opening theory was being developed. International tournaments were held in 1998 and 2001.

The internet chess server Lichess facilitates play of the game, referring to it as "antichess"; after regular chess it is the most popular variant on the site in terms of numbers of games played. Since 2018 the site has hosted an annual "Lichess World Championship" for the variant. Chess.com also added this variant to their server, calling it "giveaway."

Analysis

Because of the forced capture rule, losing chess games often involve long sequences of  captures by one player. This means that a minor mistake can doom a game. Such mistakes can be made from the very first move—it is currently known that a Black win can be forced after 13 of White's 20 legal opening moves. Some of these openings took months of computer time to solve, but wins against common chess openings 1.e4, 1.d4, and 1.d3 consist of simple series of forced captures and can be played from memory by most average players.

In the table below, green marks winning first moves for White; red marks losing first moves; and yellow marks moves that are not yet solved.

This main variant of losing chess was weakly solved in October 2016; White is able to force a win beginning with 1.e3. This solution is valid for both FICS and "International" rules on stalemate. Some lines are trivial (1…d6, 1…d5, 1…Na6, and 1…g6 lose in less than 20 moves), others are quite simple (1…Nf6, 1…h6, 1…e5, 1…f5, 1…h5, 1…f6, 1…a6, 1…a5 lose in less than 30 moves, subject to knowledge of the theory), and some are quite complicated (1…Nh6, 1…Nc6, 1…c6, the win in which may require about 60 moves). The most difficult are the following five openings (in order of increasing difficulty): 1.e3 g5 (Wild Boar Defence), 1.e3 e6 (Modern Defence), 1.e3 b5 (Classical Defence), 1.e3 c5 (Polish Defence), and 1.e3 b6 (Liardet Defence).

David Pritchard, the author of The Encyclopedia of Chess Variants, wrote that the "complexity and beauty" of losing chess is found in its endgame. He noted that, in contrast to regular chess, losing chess endgames with just two pieces require considerable skill to play correctly, whereas three- or four-piece endgames can exceed human capacity to solve precisely. For example, the following endgames may turn out to be quite complicated: 2 Knights vs Rook, 3 Kings vs King, or Bishop+Knight+King vs King. In the latter case, in particular, a win may require more than 60 moves, which means that it is sometimes unattainable due to the fifty-move rule.

Variations

Variations regarding stalemate

Implementations of the main variant can vary in regard to stalemate. "International" rules are as described above, with the stalemated player winning even if that player still has pieces on the board. FICS rules resolve stalemate as a win for the player with the fewer number of pieces remaining; if both have the same number, it is a draw (the piece types are irrelevant). "Joint" FICS/International rules resolves stalemate as a draw unless it is a victory for the same player under both rulesets. The stalemate in the diagram is a win for White under "International" rules, a win for Black under FICS rules, and a draw under "joint" rules.

Variants in The Encyclopedia of Chess Variants
Pritchard discusses the following variants of the game in The Encyclopedia of Chess Variants.

Variant 2

Rules are the same as the main rules, except:

Variant 3

Rules are the same as the main rules, except:
 The king has royal powers, and removing the king from check takes precedence over capturing another piece.
 A player wins by reducing his pieces to a bare king, or by checkmating the opponent.
 Stalemate is a draw.

Variant 4

Rules are the same as variant 3, except:
 A player wins by reducing his pieces to a bare king, or by getting checkmated.

Notes

References

Bibliography
Verney, M. G. H. (1885). Chess Eccentricities. London: Longman, Green, & Co. p. 191.

Andrejić, Vladica (2018). The Ultimate Guide to Antichess. Belgrade: JP “Službeni Glasnik”.

External links
 Losing Chess by Hans Bodlaender, The Chess Variant Pages
The Ultimate Guide to Antichess by Vladica Andrejić
 Losing Chess by Fabrice Liardet 
Losing Chess Solution by Mark Watkins
Nilatac's Opening Book Losing Chess book browser by Cătălin Frâncu
Antichess Solution Browser Forced wins in Losing Chess
Losing Chess Puzzles Losing Chess puzzles and endgame training
 Scidb a chess database supporting Losing Chess
 Losing Chess Losing Chess II Losing Chess III Losing Chess IV simple programs by Ed Friedlander (Java)

Chess variants
Solved games